Sora Fukuzumi (born 15 February 2002) is a Japanese professional footballer who plays as a defender for WE League club Nojima Stella Kanagawa Sagamihara.

Club career 
Fukuzumi made her WE League debut on 10 October 2021.

References 

WE League players
Living people
2002 births
Japanese women's footballers
Women's association football defenders
Nojima Stella Kanagawa Sagamihara players
Association football people from Tokyo Metropolis
People from Machida, Tokyo